Spiros Pizanis (Greek: Σπύρος Πιζάνης; (1870, Corfu - 1927, Rome) was a Greek painter; one of their first Impressionists.

Βiography
His father, Stefanos, originally from Venice, was a decorative artist, known for his wall paintings at the Achilleion, and restorative work at the Nobile Teatro di San Giacomo di Corfù. He studied in Rome and at the Athens School of Fine Arts, with Charalambos Pachis. From around 1900, he taught night classes, sponsored by the Italian Ministry of Education. Epameinondas Thomopoulos was one of his best known students. From 1905 to 1907, he operated a private school.

In 1907, he moved to Smyrna, where he taught drawing and painting at the newly founded "Scuola D'Ivrea Centrale"; operated by an order of Italian Catholic nuns. Eventually, he became a manager there. He was forced to leave during the Turkish War of Independence; taking his family to Rome, where he once again became an art teacher. He remained there until his death in 1927.

His works are notable for their coloristic effects. His larger works have been scattered. Most are in Rome, although many are in Smyrna, Ankara, and Genoa.

He was married to Melpomene Pachis, a daughter of his former teacher.

References

Further reading
 Tonis Spiteris, 3 αιώνες νεοελληνικής τέχνης (Three Centuries of Greek Art), Papyros, 1979
 Giorgos Karter, Ανιχνεύσεις και εκτιμήσεις (roughly "Detections and Assessments"), Alexikis Dimitris, 2008

External links

1870 births
1927 deaths
Greek painters
Greek landscape painters
Athens School of Fine Arts alumni
Greek emigrants to Italy
Artists from Corfu
Impressionist painters